HMS Inconstant was a 36-gun  fifth-rate frigate of the Royal Navy. She had a successful career serving in the French Revolutionary and Napoleonic Wars, capturing three French warships during the French Revolutionary naval campaigns,  Curieux, Unité, and the former British ship .

Construction and commissioning

Inconstant was ordered on 8 December 1781 and laid down at the yards of William Barnard, Deptford, in December 1782. She was launched on 28 October 1783, and was immediately fitted out for ordinary, a process completed by 22 March 1784. She was moved to Woolwich in October 1788 and there fitted out for sea between June and November 1790. She had cost a total of £16,226.0.1d (including the work to fit her for ordinary, with a further £6,627 spent in 1790 to prepare her for sea.

Career
Inconstant was commissioned in August 1790 under Captain George Wilson. Wilson commanded her for just over a year before she was paid off in September 1791.

French Revolutionary wars

Inconstant returned to Woolwich and was fitted out again between January and February 1793 at a cost of £7,239. She was recommissioned under Captain Augustus Montgomery and joined the fleet under Richard Howe. She sailed to the West Indies in April, and captured the 14-gun Curieux there on 3 June 1793.

Inconstant returned to England in July that year, sailing again in November bound for Toulon to join Samuel Hood's fleet. She was briefly commanded by Captain George Cockburn in 1794, who was succeeded by Thomas Fremantle in January 1795. Under Fremantle, and as part of the fleet under Admiral William Hotham, she fought against the 80-gun ship of the line  on 10 March 1795. Ça Iras superiority in firepower soon forced Fremantle to fall back. As he did so, commanded by Captain Horatio Nelson, surged past to continue the fight. This was a prelude to the Naval Battle of Genoa, fought over the next few days.

On 25 March Inconstant recaptured  from the French, and went on to form part of Nelson's squadron in August. On 20 April 1796 she captured the French Unité. Inconstant was then present at the evacuation of Leghorn on 26 June 1796. After an active period in the Mediterranean, she was paid off in September 1797. She was refitted at Woolwich between March and June 1798, returning to service as a 20-gun troopship. She was commanded by Commander Milham Ponsonby until being paid off in October 1799, after which she was refitted and recommissioned as a fifth-rate under Commander John Ayscough. Inconstant was initially operating in the North Sea, before receiving orders to move to support operations in Egypt in 1801. Because Inconstant served in the navy's Egyptian campaign (8 March to 8 September 1801), her officers and crew qualified for the clasp "Egypt" to the Naval General Service Medal that the Admiralty authorised in 1850 for all surviving claimants.

She came under the command of captain Richard Byron in October 1802, who was succeeded by Captain Edward Dickson by December.

Napoleonic Wars
Inconstant was fitted out as a troopship again in late 1803, and was present at the capture of Gorée in March 1804. She was restored to a frigate between 1805 and 1806, and spent the period between 1806 and 1808 as the flagship of Vice-Admiral James Saumarez.

On 6 May 1807 the boats of Inconstant captured the French ship Julia.  and Jamaica shared in the proceeds of the capture.

Inconstant underwent a large repair between 1808 and 1809, after which she sailed to the Cape of Good Hope. She was paid off in 1810, and refitted at Portsmouth. She recommissioned again in October that year, under the command of Captain John Quilliam, who was succeeded by Captain Edward Owen  by December. Owen remained in command until 1812, and was succeeded by Sir Edward Tucker. On 19 December 1812  recaptured the whaler .

Tucker sailed Inconstant to South America.

On 18 March 1815, Inconstant and Albacore recaptured Acorn and her cargo.

In August 1815 Inconstant was serving as Captain James Lucas Yeo's flagship.

Fate

HMS Inconstant was broken up at Portsmouth in November 1817.

Notes

Citations

References
 
 
 

 

Frigates of the Royal Navy
1783 ships